Guiding Eyes for the Blind is one of the  eleven schools in the U.S. for training guide dogs—dogs trained to lead the blind and visually impaired. It houses a  headquarters, training center, and veterinary clinic in Yorktown Heights, New York, and it also operates a canine development center in Patterson, New York, and a training site in White Plains, New York.

The school offers a program designed for blind and visually impaired students with additional developmental or physical challenges,  such as deafness or seizure disorders.  Dogs and staff are specifically selected and receive extra training to enable them to assist these students. Over 1,300 volunteers assist Guiding Eyes by performing roles such as fostering members of the breeding colony, spending time with the dogs in training, and assisting with administrative tasks.

Background

Guiding Eyes for the Blind was founded in 1954 by Donald Z. Kauth in a 19th-century farmhouse. Since then, it has graduated over 7,300 guide dog teams and placed 61 service dogs in homes with families with autistic people. Headquartered in Yorktown Heights, New York, 35 miles north of New York City, Guiding Eyes for the Blind was the first guide dog training school to be accredited by the National Accreditation Council for Agencies Serving the Blind and Visually Handicapped. Guiding Eyes employs more than 140 people who raise, care and train dogs from their own established gene pool and make them available to recipients free of charge. It depends on donations and a community of more than 1,000 volunteers to provide its numerous programs. Guiding Eyes for the Blind was one of the first schools to accept elderly students and legally blind students who have a degree of residual vision.

Guiding Eyes is an internationally accredited dog school that provides the blind and visually impaired with Guiding Eyes dogs, training, and lifetime support services. In 1966, Guiding Eyes began breeding their own dogs. Prior to that time, extensive time and effort was invested in searching shelters and other sources for adult dogs and puppies. Today, Guiding Eyes for the Blind's breeding program supplies more than 90% of the dogs used by the school.

The Canine Development Center (CDC) located in Patterson, New York, is where guide dogs begin their careers. The first steps are taken to creating a successful guide dog team: breeding, birthing, socializing, screening, and placing high-potential puppies in puppy-raising homes. The Canine Development Center is at the leading edge of advances in canine genetics, breeding technology, and behavioral development. Through selective breeding, Guiding Eyes has maximized the qualities required for a working guide dog and minimized health problems that could disrupt or shorten a guide dog's working years. Each year there are approximately 500 puppies bred at Guiding Eyes and half will become working dogs. The training center has also developed a curriculum and training program for those students with multiple disabilities such as deafness or orthopedic problems, in addition to their visual impairment. The Special Needs Program gives selected guide dogs additional training designed for a specific students unique requirements.

In 2007, the Canine Development Center staff engaged in extensive research in puppy training. In 2009, the staff worked with design consultants to explore how to effectively develop the CDC's 30-acre property into a one-of-a-kind facility. Guiding Eyes also acquired an in-house Veterinary Magnetic Resonance Machine (MRI) making it the only guide dog school in the world equipped with this technology. In 2011, Guiding Eyes launched its One Step Ahead campaign, a fundraising drive to raise $8 million to build a world-class puppy training academy on its Patterson property.

Breeding

Guiding Eyes for the Blind provides specially bred Labrador Retrievers and German Shepherds. The most commonly used breed is the Labrador Retriever. They can be placed in every environment and with any person due to their versatility. Most of the puppies are bred from Guiding Eye's own breeding colony located in Patterson, New York. Dogs are bred for health, confidence, and temperament. Guiding Eyes for the Blind began their breeding program in 1966. Through selective breeding, animals have been developed with intelligence, temperament, and natural aptitude needed for careers as guide dogs. Because of this, success rates are going up and dogs are becoming more confident. The success has to do with the sophistication of breeding colonies, where the guide schools have been able to observe the body and mind of the guide dog.

	Puppies are not neutered or spayed until they go back to Guiding Eyes. Once they come back puppies are evaluated and Guiding Eyes keeps the highest quality dogs to carry on their lines and raise future generations of guide dogs. The dogs undergo further evaluation, including an extensive medical exam, to determine if they are suitable candidates for the breeding program. In addition to examining the dog, its siblings' progress and health is considered as well. If it turns out that they are a suitable candidate, then they continue on to Guide Dog training. With careful monitoring, generation after generation, guide schools mix and match parents to get the traits they need. Experts test each puppy's elbows and hips, and track which parents produce the healthiest offspring. Genetically, experts have focused their attention on two major traits. One is hip quality; dogs with hip dysplasia will not be used. The second is behavior. Jane Russenberger, senior director of breeding at Guiding Eyes for the Blind in Patterson, has had success in the Labrador Retrievers. In general the Labrador Retriever incidence of hip dysplasia is about 20%, but in Guiding Eyes for the Blind's population it is about 2%. Russenberger believes the success comes in part from sheer numbers. Working with so many dogs has allowed Guiding Eyes for the Blind to take an already successful idea to higher levels.

A study done by Cornell University Veterinary School looked at 1,498 dogs from Guiding Eyes for the Blind. The study took measurements of hip joint quality. Cornell found a complex generation from a family of Labrador Retrievers. This included 1,236 connected dogs over 17 generations from a particular male dog. The results of selective breeding were evident in the relationship between breeding values and their accuracy. Over half of the Labrador Retrievers were bred at the Guiding Eyes for the Blind facility. Dogs with more accurate breeding values produced more progeny, with clustering of breeding values with higher accuracy indicative of better hip joint confirmation. This indicates that the selective breeding practice of Guiding Eyes for the Blind program are effective in improving hip joint conformation in dogs. Overall the study confirmed that the selection of dogs for hip joint quality resulted in genetic improvement predominantly in the last 10 to 15 years .

Puppy Raising

First 9 weeks

When a guide dog is born, its training begins immediately. The dogs are born in the Whelping Kennel facility of Guiding Eyes for the Blind (GEB), which is located in Patterson, New York. Trained volunteers begin the first and most important part of a guide dog's training: socialization. The first nine weeks of guide dog training consists of exposure to various environments and experiences to help with their emotional and intellectual development. By simply interacting with the dogs on a daily basis, trained volunteers help foster the bond that must be present between guide dogs and their human companions. In addition, these volunteers are trained in puppy massage techniques that help the dogs become familiar with being handled and improve the dogs' health. Aside from socialization, the dogs are also taught a few basic commands and guide dog etiquette. The first command every guide dog in GEB learns is "sit", as it is a simple command and fairly natural for the dog to do. Also taught are crate etiquette and toileting etiquette (which is referred to as "get busy"). The socializers introduce the dogs to the crate early on so that they are familiar with it, as oftentimes the dogs will spend a lot of time in the crate, and it is important for them to behave themselves while in it. The crate training is not extensive during the first nine weeks, but more of a way to get the dogs to have a positive attitude with the crate. The dogs are also house trained. In other words, volunteers teach the dogs to alert their human companion when they need to "get busy". The dogs are not fully trained at this time and are prone to accidents, but for the most part, they know how to "get busy" outside.

9 weeks-18 months

After the dog reaches anywhere from 7–9 weeks, they are then matched with a volunteer Puppy Raiser screened by GEB. During this period, the dogs go through training that could be classified as extended socialization. The puppy raisers take the dogs home and teach them how a guide dog is supposed to interact with the outside world. At this time, more commands are introduced, including: "stand", "down", "stay", "touch", "back", "heel" and "close". Dogs must also learn to keep calm, ignore distractions, and obey their masters in all situations. During this time the dogs learn how to greet other people and how to interact with different social settings. The raisers are encouraged to take the dogs to as many different places as they can to introduce them to new experiences, as long as the dog is ready them. Raisers must take care not to ask too much of the dog or go too fast with the training procedures. To keep track of a dog's progress as well as their training and their raisers, GEB has puppy classes for the raiser/dog pairs. At these classes, the training methods are enforced and the raiser and dog get to practice the commands in a controlled environment. GEB also provides veterinary care for the dogs without cost to the raiser. Another set of volunteers that are involved in a dog's life at this point and time are called "puppy sitters". Puppy sitters are just like raisers in many ways. They go through the same training and oftentimes attend the puppy classes as well, but do not keep the dog with them for 18 months like raisers. Puppy sitters will often take puppies for a period of time and expose the puppy to their social group, which is often different from that of the puppy raiser. This way, the dogs get a wider variety of exposure to different things.

Multi-generational fostering
A 2011 multi-generational volunteer dog foster program at Atlantic Shores in Virginia Beach, Virginia, one of the first programs of its type in the nation, brings together qualified retirement community residents and elementary school students.  The foster puppies live with selected senior citizens in the Atlantic Shores retirement community, where the dogs have early exposure to elevators, sidewalks, ramps, wheelchairs, and sliding doors—elements that mirror the conditions in the second phase, when dogs receive 18 months of formal training. At the retirement community, the puppies are integrated into normal everyday resident activities and will be featured in special events focused on the puppies.  Beginning at age 11 weeks, the puppies also go out to local elementary schools, where classes instruct students about the guide dog service and proper interaction with guide dogs. Students also create their own reporting segments and follow the progress of the guide dogs via in class broadcasts on the schools' television feeds.

Formal Training

After a dog reaches 13–18 months, they are then returned to Guiding Eyes for an In For Training (IFT) test. This test provides information on how well the dog handles stress without a familiar person to support them. Dogs able to pass their IFT are adaptable to different situations, and are confident and relaxed even though they are in an unfamiliar environment. If a dog does not do well on their IFT, as well as if they have had a history of consistent insecurities or poor adaptability with their raisers, they are usually released at this point. Other dogs that pass and show promise are often either re-evaluated or start with the training program. Other dogs will join the Guiding Eyes breeding colony, and become parents to future generations of Guiding Eyes dogs.

It takes roughly four months to train a guide dog, with an additional month to train the new owner with the dog. During this time, dogs increase their command vocabulary from the basic "come", "sit", "stay" that they learned with their raiser to more advanced commands such as "find the crossing" and "find the door". The reason for this type of training is for the dog to be able to use his/her initiative instead of direct obedience. Guiding Eyes does not want dogs that obey no matter what. They want dogs that obey, as long as it keeps both the owner and the dog out of danger. Most of the formal training is done in the natural environment like quiet suburb as well as busy streets and rural areas. The only artificial methods of training involve obstacles and traffic work. The dog learns how to travel to the left and to the right of the object with a preference that the unit (dog and handler) travel to the right so that the dog is between the obstacle and the owner. At this point of training, the dog is in a full harness.

In addition to working on obstacles, there is also traffic work, which tends to be the most complicated part of the dog's training. One of the main reasons for this is because at this point, the dog needs to learn how to disobey a command if it is unsafe to follow the instructions it is given. First, a dog learns to stop at all intersections. The handler then listens whether it is safe to cross or not before giving the command. However, if a car is coming, the dog will disobey the command and wait for the road to be clear before crossing. To ensure that the training is complete, the handler will often go through the process with the dog with a blindfold on to make sure that the dog is really ready for their new handler.

Matching a guide dog to a blind person is arguably the most important part of the entire process. Any blind person can apply for the course; however, they receive an in-depth home interview and then are evaluated based on their physical abilities and personalities before being matched with a dog. The guide dogs and students then meet and spend 26 days at the Yorktown Heights training facility learning to work safely with each other. The four-month process the dogs just went through is approximately repeated, but at a faster pace (i.e. 26 days). At the conclusion of this training, a graduation ceremony is held in celebration of the new partnerships and puppy raisers get to see their dogs become full-fledged guide dogs. After graduation, Guiding Eyes instructors provide follow-up services, as needed, to graduates in order to provide assistance, suggestions and general support as required. The average working life of a dog is 8–10 years. Often, the dog will live out his life in the home with the handler, if possible. Alternately, Guiding Eyes makes sure that retired dogs are placed into loving homes.

Career Change Dogs

Not all dogs who begin the Guiding Eyes program graduate and become guide dogs. Sometimes, even dogs who pass their IFTs and go to formal training are deemed unfit to become a guide dog. However, some of the personality and temperament traits that make a dog unsuitable for guide dog work are the specific traits that are ideal for detection or patrol work.

Finances
Guiding Eyes is a 501(c)(3) nonprofit organization, funded via private donations. The school does not charge tuition; rather, the dogs, training, students' room and board for 26 days and a follow-up support are provided at no cost to the student.

According to Charity Navigator, GEB had income of $19 million for fiscal year 2009/2010 and assets of $50 million. GEB is an accredited BBB organization and has received a 54.57 rating, or three of four possible stars, at Charity Navigator, not meeting criteria for transparency related to the process of determining compensation of the CEO and not meeting criteria for audited financials.

GEB's biggest fundraiser is an annual golf tournament which has been hosted for the past six years by Eli Manning, quarterback for the New York Giants.  The tournament was founded by former professional golfer and golf broadcaster Ken Venturi in 1977 and each year awards the Corcoran Cup, named after Fred Corcoran.  GEB's founder, Don Kauth, had encouraged Richard "Dick" Ryan to start a golf tournament.  Ryan, an attorney, was GEB's board chairman and represented Augusta National Golf Club.  Ryan agreed, naming the tournament after his business partner, Corcoran.  The golf tournament, sponsored by Entergy, Pepsi and others, has raised over $7 million for Guiding Eyes since its creation in 1977.

Since 2008, Guiding Eyes has operated an e-storefront with Lands' End via that company's Business Outfitters division. Customers can order clothing embroidered with logos associated with the dog breeds bred and trained by Guiding Eyes in their work: yellow and black Labrador Retrievers, Golden Retrievers and German Shepherds.  The artwork was produced by a company in Norwalk, Connecticut, TFI/Envision.

In 2010, Guiding Eyes initiated expansion of its canine development center from 16,000 square feet to 30,000sf in a three-phase $7.8 million construction project.  The first phase included a whelping kennel and outdoor work area; the second phase, projected for 2013 will include a breeding and puppy socialization kennel; and the third phase will include a 1,500-square foot veterinary hospital.

Charity Watch rates Guiding Eyes for the Blind a "B" grade.

Guiding Eyes in the News
"Guiding Eyes for the Blind Is Sponsoring a Walkathon"
"For Guide Dogs, Boot Camp Is Tough (No Chewing Allowed)"
"Guiding Eyes for the Blind Receives $3 Million Grant from PepsiCo Foundation"

See also
Assistance dog
Blindness
Guide horse
List of Guide Dog Schools
Service dog
White cane

References

External links
 Guiding Eyes for the Blind Official Site
International Guide Dog Federation
Assistance Dog International's directory of membership organizations
Legal information about service animals in the United States
Atlantic Shores, retirement community with GEB puppy cam

Guide dogs
Dog organizations
Blindness organizations in the United States
Non-profit organizations based in New York (state)